Louis and the Brothel is a 2003 British documentary by Louis Theroux.

Theroux visits the Wild Horse Adult Resort & Spa, a licensed brothel located near the city of Reno, Nevada, where he investigates how the brothel is run. During his visit Theroux interviews the owners who personally run the resort, the women who work there as prostitutes and their clients.

Theroux would revisit the subjects of the documentary in his book The Call of the Weird: Travels in American Subcultures.

Reception
The Age described how "the most compelling stories come from the clients themselves." The Herald described the documentary as "a documentary cliche. How many British filmmakers have been titillated by the fact that prostitution is legal in Nevada?"

References

External links
 Louis and the Brothel at BBC Two
  Louis and the Brothel at IMDb

2003 television specials
BBC television documentaries
Documentary films about prostitution in the United States
Films shot in Nevada
Louis Theroux's BBC Two specials
Documentary films about Nevada
British documentary films
Television episodes set in Nevada
BBC travel television series